The Néra River is a river of New Caledonia. It has a catchment area of 546 square kilometres, forming one of the largest river systems on the west coast. It empties into the eastern side of Gouaro Bay.

See also
List of rivers of New Caledonia

References

Rivers of New Caledonia